Seyssinet-Pariset is a commune in the Isère department in southeastern France. It is part of the Grenoble urban unit (agglomeration).

Population

Sights
La tour Sans venin located in the hamlet of Pariset, is known among the Seven wonders of Dauphiné

Notable people
Marcel Trillat (1940–2020), journalist and documentary filmmaker.

See also
Parc naturel régional du Vercors

References

Communes of Isère
Isère communes articles needing translation from French Wikipedia